China Seas is a 1935 American adventure film starring Clark Gable as a brave sea captain, Jean Harlow as his brassy paramour, and Wallace Beery as a suspect character. The oceangoing epic also features Lewis Stone, Rosalind Russell, Akim Tamiroff, and Hattie McDaniel, while humorist Robert Benchley memorably portrays a character reeling drunk from one end of the film to the other.

The lavish MGM epic was written by James Kevin McGuinness and Jules Furthman from the 1930 book by Crosbie Garstin, and directed by Tay Garnett. This is one of only four sound films with Beery in which he did not receive top billing.

Plot
Alan Gaskell (Clark Gable) is an abrasive, gambling, captain of a steamer, the Kin Lung, chugging between Singapore and Hong Kong. Tensions are high before the Kin Lung sails from Hong Kong because pirates are discovered disguised as women passengers while others try to smuggle weapons aboard.

Dolly Portland (Jean Harlow) is Alan's former girlfriend, who Alan later describes at the Captain's table as a "professional entertainer," and travels with her maid. Meanwhile, another of Alan's former loves, aristocratic Sybil Barclay (Rosalind Russell) from Sussex, England boards the Kin Lung. "I am in your hands again," Sybil taunts Alan, and eventually they plan to marry when the steamer docks in Singapore. However, Dolly tries to win back Alan. Meanwhile, Jamesy McArdle (Wallace Beery) is a corrupt passenger, in league with a gang of pirates planning to steal the gold shipment of GBP250,000 gold bullion carried on the steamer. Dolly discovers the plot and attempts to warn Capt. Gaskell against McArdle but he deflects her warnings.

In calm seas, following a typhoon in which the ship suffered damage to its cargo and the deaths of some crew, the Kin Lung is boarded by Malay pirates, as McArdle expected and with whom he is in alliance. The pirates steal personal possessions from passengers. Unable to find gold in the ships strongbox, which Capt. Gaskell has replaced with sand, they torture Capt. Gaskell using a Malay Boot but the captain will not reveal the gold's location. Instead, with bravado, Gaskell instructs the pirates, as they prepare to torture him: "My size is 9C", before fainting from pain. While leaving the ship, minus the gold they intended to steal, the pirate's ship is bombed by 3rd officer Davis, who dies while throwing a Mills Bomb as a grenade, and later strafed by Capt. Gaskell. Their ship sinks in the South China Sea.

Frustrated by the failed robbery McArdle commits suicide. When the Kin Lung docks in Singapore, Captain Gaskell, still limping due to his torture, settles that his love for Sybil is superficial. Instead he recognises that Dolly gave him good warning and he loves her more. They decide to marry. He says farewell to Sybil. As the film closes Capt. Gaskell reveals the gold was safe all along, hidden inside the ship's cargo (the toolbox of a steamroller stowed on deck).

Cast  
 Clark Gable as Captain Alan Gaskell
 Jean Harlow as Dolly 'China Doll' Portland 
 Wallace Beery as Jamesy McArdle
 Lewis Stone as Tom Davids
 Rosalind Russell as Sybil Barclay
 Dudley Digges as Dawson
 C. Aubrey Smith as Sir Guy Wilmerding
 Robert Benchley as Charlie McCaleb
 Akim Tamiroff as Paul Romanoff
 William Henry as Rockwell
 Liev De Maigret as Mrs. Vollberg (credited as Live de Maigret)
 Lilian Bond as Mrs. Timmons (credited as Lillian Bond)
 Edward Brophy as Timmons
 Soo Yong as Yu-Lan
 Carol Ann Beery as Carol Ann
 Ivan Lebedeff as Ngah
 Hattie McDaniel as Isabel McCarthy, Dolly's Maid (uncredited)
 Donald Meek as Passenger playing chess (uncredited)

Production

Irving Thalberg had worked on the film since 1930 when he assigned three different writers to come up with three different treatments. By 1931 Thalberg had decided on the one storyline and spent the next four years working on a script with two dozen writers, half a dozen dir/and three supervisors.

Gable had several temper tantrums on the set, which were tolerated by MGM studio chief Louis B. Mayer because the star had recently won an Academy Award for Best Actor in It Happened One Night (1934) on a loan-out to Columbia Pictures, and he did not want to risk losing him. Mayer even tolerated that Gable risked his life by refusing a stunt double in a sequence in which he assisted numerous Chinese extras in roping in a runaway steamroller that crashed up and down the decks of the cantilevered studio ship.

China Seas was an early Hollywood formula adventure-movie loosely using the plot of Gable and Harlow's earlier film titled Red Dust (1932) featuring Mary Astor in Russell's role, which was subsequently remade with Gable, Ava Gardner and Grace Kelly two decades later as Mogambo (1953).

Wallace Beery had worked with both Gable and Harlow in The Secret Six (1931), in which Gable and Harlow had smaller supporting roles and Beery played the lead. Beery and Gable also appeared together later the same year in the naval aviation film titled Hell Divers (1931), this time with Gable's part almost as large as top-billed star Beery's. The pairing of Gable and Harlow was so popular after Red Dust (1932) that they wound up making six films together, with the final one being finished posthumously after Harlow's untimely death.

Reception
The film was a big hit earning $1,710,000 in the US and Canada and $1,157,000 elsewhere resulting in profits of $653,000.

References

External links

 
 
 
 
 
 China Seas at malayablackandwhite

1935 films
1935 adventure films
1935 romantic drama films
American romantic drama films
American adventure drama films
American black-and-white films
Films scored by Herbert Stothart
Films based on British novels
Films directed by Tay Garnett
Films produced by Irving Thalberg
Films set in Hong Kong
Films set in Singapore
Metro-Goldwyn-Mayer films
Films with screenplays by Jules Furthman
Seafaring films
1930s English-language films
1930s American films